Thomas Lionel Hill Jr. (born August 31, 1971) is an American former professional basketball player.

A 6'5" shooting guard, Hill played at Duke University from 1989 to 1993, winning two NCAA Championships (1991 and 1992). His teammates at Duke included Grant Hill (no relation), Christian Laettner, and Bobby Hurley. Thomas Hill received Third Team All-ACC honors in 1991,1992, 1993 and was a team captain during his senior season. 
 
He played in 141 career games for Duke, 6th on their all-time list as of March 28, 2010; directly behind Jon Scheyer, and tied with Brian Davis.

After graduating, Hill was drafted by the Indiana Pacers in the 2nd round (#39 pick overall) of the 1993 NBA draft. Hill never played an NBA regular season game but he did play in preseason games where he scored a high of 14. He played in the Australian National Basketball League for one season (appearing in just nine games) for the Perth Wildcats.

Thomas Hill's father, Thomas Sr., won a bronze medal in the 110-meter hurdles at the 1972 Summer Olympics.

Hill is perhaps best remembered for his emotional reaction after his Duke teammate Christian Laettner hit a last-second shot to defeat Kentucky in the elite eight of the 1992 NCAA Tournament. After Laettner hit the shot, a CBS camera panned to Hill who appeared to be crying of joy with his hands on top of his head.

After his basketball career Hill proceeded to coach for Avenues: The World School in New York City and currently is the head coach of varsity basketball and varsity tennis. 
 
He just finished a coaching job At Howard University and is looking for yet another coaching job.

Notes

External links
Finnish League profile

1971 births
Living people
African-American basketball players
American expatriate basketball people in Australia
American expatriate basketball people in Finland
American men's basketball players
Basketball players at the 1991 Pan American Games
Basketball players from Texas
Duke Blue Devils men's basketball players
Fargo-Moorhead Fever players
Fort Wayne Fury players
Indiana Pacers draft picks
Pan American Games bronze medalists for the United States
Pan American Games medalists in basketball
People from Lancaster, Texas
Perth Wildcats players
Shooting guards
Sportspeople from the Dallas–Fort Worth metroplex
Medalists at the 1991 Pan American Games
21st-century African-American sportspeople
20th-century African-American sportspeople